Dumb blonde is a deprecating stereotype of women with blond hair.

Dumb Blonde may also refer to:

"Dumb Blonde" (Dolly Parton song), 1966
 Dum Blonde", a song by Emily Blue from the 2018 album *69
"Dumb Blonde" (Avril Lavigne song), 2019

See also
 "Another Dumb Blonde", a 2000 song by American singer Hoku